Piedmont Council may refer to:

 Piedmont Council (California)
 Piedmont Council (North Carolina)

See also
 Piedmont (disambiguation)